KZMM-CD, virtual channel 22 (UHF digital channel 35), is a low-powered, Class A television station licensed to Fresno, California, United States, which primarily airs paid programming. The station is owned by HC2 Holdings.

History

On January 4, 1991, the station signed on as Mas Musica affiliate K07UX, and the station was later granted Class A status in 2004.

In December 2005, Viacom acquired Más Música and ten of the network's affiliated stations (Including KZMM). The sale was finalized in January 2006, when Más Música became MTV Tres, and KZMM started broadcasting that programming. The station continued the tradition & aired videos of various Latin American music styles, including Latin Hip Hop and R&B, Rock and Contemporary Spanish-language hits, a constant that remained even with the merger of Mas Musica into "MTV Tr3́s". General programming also airs from the station's current network.

In 2013, CNZ Communications purchased KZMM from Viacom.

On August 3, 2015, KZMM-CD dropped the MTV Tres affiliation and went to be a Spanish independent station, and also added additional subchannels with additional programming.

Digital channels
The station's digital signal is multiplexed:

References

External links
 

ZMM-CD
Low-power television stations in the United States
Television channels and stations established in 1999
1999 establishments in California